Euzophera umbrosella is a species of snout moth in the genus Euzophera. It was described by Staudinger in 1879. It is found in Greece, Crete and Cyprus, as well as Turkey and Iran.

The wingspan is 17–19 mm.

References

Moths described in 1879
Phycitini
Moths of Europe
Moths of Asia